She Couldn't Say No is a 1930 American Pre-Code drama which stars Winnie Lightner, fresh from her success in Gold Diggers of Broadway (1929). It was adapted from a play by Benjamin M. Kaye. An aspiring singer ends up in a love triangle with a gangster and a socialite.

Synopsis
Winnie Harper (Lightner) is a nightclub entertainer. This club is owned by a notorious gangster named Big John (Marshall). Jerry Casey (Morris), a gangster, begins dating Winnie and becomes her manager in an attempt to go straight. Jerry manages to put Winnie in a fancy society nightclub.

Morris, however, falls in love with Iris, a rich customer (Eilers). In order to be able to buy gifts worthy of his new socialite girlfriend, and also to get money for Winnie's upcoming revue, Jerry asks Big John for another job. Jerry tells Winnie about his love for Iris but she thinks that Iris is not serious about their relationship.

Later on, Jerry gets arrested and Winnie pays his bail, but is broken-hearted when Jerry leaves her to return to Iris. Winnie, with the help of Tommy Blake her pianist (Arthur), lands a job in a revue and attempts to forget Jerry. Nevertheless, when she hears that Jerry is in trouble with his fellow gang members, she goes to try to help him.

Cast
 Winnie Lightner as Winnie Harper
 Chester Morris as Jerry Casey
 Sally Eilers as Iris
 Johnny Arthur as Tommy Blake, Harper's pianist
 Tully Marshall as Big John
 Louise Beavers as Cora

Songs
All songs were performed by Lightner.
 "Watching My Dreams Go By", lyrics by Al Dubin, music by Joe Burke
 "A Darn Fool Woman Like Me", Al Dubin and Joe Burke
 "Bouncing the Baby Around", Al Dubin and Joe Burke
 "Ping Pongo"
 "The Poison Kiss of That Spaniard"

Preservation status
She Couldn't Say No is now considered a lost film, but the soundtrack survives intact on Vitaphone disks.

See also
 List of lost films

Notes

External links 
 
 
 
 

1930 films
1930 drama films
American drama films
American black-and-white films
1930s English-language films
Films about organized crime in the United States
Films directed by Lloyd Bacon
Lost American films
Warner Bros. films
Films with screenplays by Robert Lord (screenwriter)
1930 lost films
Lost drama films
1930s American films